Esimbi is a Tivoid language of southwestern Cameroon. It is also called Isimbi, Simpi, Age, Aage, Bogue and Mburugam.

Writing system

High tone is indicated with an acute accent and medium tone is indicated with a macron.

References

Languages of Cameroon
Tivoid languages
Southern Bantoid languages